Arnolds Spekke (or Arnolds Speke; born 14 June 1887, Vecmuiža parish, Russian Empire — died 27 July 1972, Washington, D.C., USA) received a doctorate in philology from the University of Latvia in 1927. In 1932 he received a Rockefeller Foundation scholarship and went studying in Poland and Italy. From 1933 to 1939 he was the Latvian envoy to Italy, Greece, Bulgaria and Albania with permanent residence in Rome, Italy.

27 July 1940, Spekke protested against the Soviet occupation of Latvia by handing over a note to the Italian government. 9 August 1940 Spekke handed over his resignation, 11 August 1940 was his last working day at the Latvian Legation in Rome. Afterwards he worked as a teacher, librarian, translator and other odd jobs in Milan and Rome.

From 1945 to 1950 Spekke worked for the Latvian Committee in Rome and 1951 he attended the founding meeting of the Latvian Liberation Committee. In 1951 Spekke published his History of Latvia, recounting the Baltic tribes and invasion by Vikings, Germans and Russians.

Beginning April 1954 Spekke was chargé d'affaires and head of the Latvian Legation in Washington, D.C. — beginning June 1954 he was also the consul general to the United States. Effective May 1963 Spekke became head of the Latvian Diplomatic and Consular Service. 1970 Spekke retired from office.

Arnolds Spekke has received the Latvian Order of the Three Stars as well as French, Polish and Swedish orders. After World War II Spekke authored more than 15 important works on Latvian history and Livonian humanists.

Bibliography 
 1951: History of Latvia
 1955: Latvia and the Baltic problem
 1957: The ancient amber routes and geographical discovery of the Eastern Baltic
 1959: Baltijas jūra senajās kartēs
 1961: The Baltic Sea in ancient maps
 1962: Some problems of Baltic-Slavic relations in prehistoric and early historical times
 1962: Senie dzintara ceļi un Austrum-Baltijas g̀eografiska atklašana
 1965: Balts and Slavs
 1965: Ķēniņa Stefana ienākšana Rīgā un cīņas par Doma baznīcu
 1967: Atminu brīži
 1995: Latvieši un Livonija 16. gs.

References 

1887 births
1972 deaths
People from Bauska Municipality
People from Courland Governorate
Ambassadors of Latvia to Italy
Ambassadors of Latvia to Bulgaria
Ambassadors of Latvia to Greece
Ambassadors of Latvia to Albania
Baltic diplomatic missions
Latvian writers
University of Latvia alumni
Academic staff of the University of Latvia
Imperial Moscow University alumni
Latvian World War II refugees
Latvian expatriates in Poland
Latvian expatriates in Italy
Latvian expatriates in Greece
Latvian expatriates in Bulgaria
Latvian emigrants to the United States